Robert Beattie is an American 21st century lawyer and author.

Robert Beattie may also refer to:

Robert Ethelbert Beattie (1875–1925), Canadian politician and pharmacist
Robert M Beattie (born 1962), British paediatric gastroenterologist
Robert Beattie (rugby union) (born 1993), Scottish rugby player
Robert Beattie (footballer) (1916–2002), Scottish footballer

See also
Bob Beattie (disambiguation)
Robert Beatty (disambiguation)